RSS Vigour (92) is the fifth ship of the Victory-class corvette of the Republic of Singapore Navy.

Construction and career 
Vigour was launched on 1 December 1989 by ST Engineering and was commissioned on 25 May 1991.

CARAT 2009 
On 15 June 2009, RSS Intrepid, RSS Conqueror, RSS Vigour, RSS Victory, RSS Stalwart, RSS Endeavour, USS Harpers Ferry, USS Chafee and USS Chung-Hoon participated in the joint exercise in the South China Sea.

CARAT 2011 
RSS Vigour, RSS Stalwart and RSS Supreme conducted a joint exercise with USS Chung-Hoon on 23 August 2011.

MH370 Search and Rescue, 2014
RSS Vigour was deployed to conduct the search and rescue operation for the missing MH370, alongside two additional C-130 aircraft, a Formidable-class frigate (RSS Steadfast) with a Sikorsky S-70B naval helicopter onboard.

Exercise PELICAN 2019 
The Republic of Singapore Navy and The Royal Brunei Navy held an exercise which consists of RSS Tenacious, RSS Valour, RSS Vigour, KDB Darussalam, KDB Darulehsan and KDB Darulaman. All Republic of Singapore Navy ships left on 7 November 2019.

Exercise CARAT 2021 
The Republic of Singapore Navy and The United States Navy conducted a joint ASEAN-USN exercise in the Philippine Sea. Other ships in attendance are KDB Daruttaqwa, KD Lekiu, KRI Martadinata, UMS Kyansitta and HTMS Kraburi

References 

== External links ==

1989 ships
Ships built in Singapore
Victory-class corvettes